National Highway 131A, commonly called NH 131A is a national highway in  India.  It is a branch of National Highway 31. NH-131A traverses the states of Bihar and West Bengal in India. It will connect Malda in West Bengal to Purnia in Bihar via Katihar. A bridge will also be constructed per the plan.

Route 

Malda, Ratua, Debipur, nakatti, Durgapur, Ahmedabad, Manihari, Katihar, Purnia.

Junctions  

  Terminal near Malda.
  at Katihar.
  Terminal at Purnia.

See also 
 List of National Highways in India
 List of National Highways in India by state

References

External links
 NH 131A on OpenStreetMap

National highways in India
National Highways in Bihar
National Highways in West Bengal
Transport in Maldah
Purnia district